The genus Androstephium is a group of North American plants in the cluster lily subfamily within the asparagus family. It contains two species native to the southwestern and south-central United States.

Species

References

External links
US Department of Agriculture plants profile, Androstephium breviflorum S. Watson pink funnel lily
US Department of Agriculture plants profile, Androstephium coeruleum (Scheele) Greene blue funnel lily 
Calflora, University of California at Berkeley, Taxon  Report   352 
Southwest Colorado Wildflowers
Pacific Bulb Society
Lady Bird Johnson Wildflower Center, University of Texas, Androstephium caeruleum 
Samuel Roberts Noble Foundation, Plant Image Gallery: Androstephium coeruleum

Asparagaceae genera
Flora of the United States
Brodiaeoideae